Anostirus is a genus of beetles in the family Elateridae.

First record of the Anostirus gracilicollis was made in Hungary by Stierlin in 1896.

The genus was described in 1859 by Carl Gustaf Thomson.

The genus has cosmopolitan distribution.

Species:
 Anostirus alexandri 
 Anostirus ataturki 
 Anostirus atropilosus 
 Anostirus binaghii 
 Anostirus boeberi 
 Anostirus castaneus 
 Anostirus cerrutii 
 Anostirus daimio 
 Anostirus dalmatinus 
 Anostirus edecorus 
 Anostirus eschscholtzii 
 Anostirus gabilloti 
 Anostirus ghilarovi 
 Anostirus gracilicollis 
 Anostirus gudenzii 
 Anostirus haemapterus 
 Anostirus hirculus 
 Anostirus holtzi 
 Anostirus incostatus 
 Anostirus jarmilae 
 Anostirus lauianus 
 Anostirus lederi 
 Anostirus marginatus 
 Anostirus melas 
 Anostirus nubilosus 
 Anostirus parumcostatus 
 Anostirus plagifer 
 Anostirus pseudosulphuripennis 
 Anostirus pulchellus 
 Anostirus pullatus 
 Anostirus purpureus 
 Anostirus reissi 
 Anostirus richterae 
 Anostirus saltinii 
 Anostirus semiaurantiacus 
 Anostirus stramineipennis 
 Anostirus sulphuripennis 
 Anostirus suvorovi 
 Anostirus teheranus 
 Anostirus trivialis 
 Anostirus turcicus 
 Anostirus turkestanicus 
 Anostirus venustus 
 Anostirus zenii

References

External links

Elateridae genera
Dendrometrinae